Black Axe is a comic book series published by Marvel UK in 1993. It was written by Simon Jowett, with pencils by Edmund Perryman and inks by Rodney Ramos. The series was cancelled abruptly after the seventh issue.

Publication history
The title was published between April and October 1993 by Marvel Comics' British imprint Marvel UK.

Fictional character biography
Black Axe is an immortal who has existed for the length of human history.

References

Black Axe at the Appendix to the Handbook of the Marvel Universe

1993 comics debuts
Marvel UK characters